Edward Swanstrom may refer to:
 Edward Ernest Swanstrom, American Roman Catholic bishop
 J. Edward Swanstrom, American lawyer and politician from New York